Emilio J. Castilla is a Spanish academic, currently residing in Boston, MA. He is Professor of Management at the MIT Sloan School of Management.

His research primarily focuses on the sociological aspects of work and employment. He is particularly interested in examining how social networks and organizational processes influence employment outcomes over time, and he tackles these questions by examining different empirical settings with unique longitudinal datasets, at both the individual and organizational level.

Early life
Emilio J. Castilla earned a graduate diploma from Lancaster University. He graduated from the University of Barcelona, where he received a Bachelor of Arts degree in Economics. He completed a PhD in Sociology from Stanford University in 2002 under Mark Granovetter.

Career
Castilla taught at the Wharton School of the University of Pennsylvania from 2002 to 2005. He has been Professor of Management at the MIT Sloan School of Management since 2005.

Castilla is a research fellow at the Wharton Financial Institutions Center and the Center for Human Resources, both of which are at the Wharton School. Additionally, he is a member of the Institute for Work and Employment Research at MIT. He is also a member of the Clayman Institute for Gender Research at Stanford University, and the Center on Race & Social Problems at the University of Pittsburgh.

Research contributions
Castilla has many research contributions about workplace inequality and meritocracy. In a 2010 article published in Administrative Science Quarterly with Stephen Benard, a Professor of Sociology at Indiana University, Castilla showed that when companies promoted meritocracy, managers tended to promote men at the expense of women. In a 2011 article published in the American Sociological Review, Castilla showed that while organizational structures do lead to workplace inequality, managers also play a role in inequality regardless of performance due to their own social networks and homophily.

Castilla has also made research contributions about immigrant workers in the United States. In 2015, with Benjamin A. Rissing, Castilla showed that Hispanic immigrants to the United States were less likely to receive work visas to be able to work legally in the United States than Canadian and Asian immigrants. To fix the bias, they suggested either auditing the process, or removing demographic details from visa applications when Homeland Security employees screen potential work visa holders.

Professor Castilla's research was featured in The Atlantic in December 2015. https://www.theatlantic.com/business/archive/2015/12/meritocracy/418074/

References

Living people
University of Barcelona alumni
Stanford University alumni
Wharton School of the University of Pennsylvania faculty
Spanish sociologists
Spanish emigrants to the United States
MIT Sloan School of Management faculty
Year of birth missing (living people)